Blytheville Air Force Base was a United States Air Force base from 1942, until it closed in 1992. In 1988, the facility was renamed Eaker Air Force Base in honor of World War II General of the Eighth Air Force, Ira C. Eaker. The facility now operates as the Arkansas Aeroplex and Arkansas International Airport.

History
Constructed on former agricultural land, the site was originally activated as the Blytheville Army Airfield in 1942. During World War II, the site served as a training airfield as part of the 70,000 Pilot Training Program. It was one of many air fields created in the country's interior during the war for this purpose. Blytheville, Arkansas was selected as a training location due to its proximity to the Mississippi River, where supplies could easily be shipped to and from the site. The airfield was used as the Southeastern Training Command's flight training school, which closed in October 1945 after the Second World War ended. Then the airfield briefly became a processing center for the rapid demobilization of military personnel being discharged. The War Assets Administration officially closed down the installation in 1946, at which point control and responsibility for the land was transferred to the city of Blytheville.

On 15 July 1955, the facility was reopened as Blytheville Air Force Base (AFB), when the 461st Bombardment Wing was moved from Hill Air Force Base in Utah. Blytheville AFB became fully operational when it was equipped with a wing of three squadrons of B-57 bomber on 19 July 1955. Other aircraft stationed at Blytheville AFB included: KC-97 refueler, B-52G bomber, KC-135A tanker, T-33 jet fighter, and the T-37 trainer—among others. In July 1959, the 97th Bombardment Wing subsequently assumed control of the base and brought with it the long-range B-52G bomber and the KC-135A Stratotanker aerial refueling aircraft to support bomber operations. Blytheville AFB experienced a great deal of activity throughout the Cold War era, when for instance, the 97th Bombardment Wing went on airborne alert on 22 October 1962, during the Cuban Missile Crisis. Two B-52G bombers were readied to strike the Soviet Union with nuclear weapons if necessary—for which the wing received the Air Force Outstanding Unit Award for its performance during the crisis.

During the Vietnam War the 97th Bomber Wing at Blytheville supported strike operations throughout the late 1960s and early 1970s. A bomber crew from Blytheville were among the first shot down during Operation Linebacker II, a December 1972 mission targeting complexes in North Vietnam. Three crewmen died in the crash. Six more men from the 97th were also lost in Vietnam, whose names are  recognized on a memorial placard at the former base. In 1972, all of the bombers were temporarily moved to Guam before being returned to Blytheville AFB, at which time the installation resumed normal functions. It launched rescue missions from the base to Grenada in 1983 and in August 1990, the pilots of the 97th Bomber Wing began practicing for missions in the Middle East and eventually supported Operation Desert Storm.

Renamed Eaker AFB and base closure
In 1988, the U.S. Air Force officially renamed Blytheville AFB to Eaker AFB in commemoration of World War II General Ira Eaker, the former commander of the 8th Air Force. Officials had hoped, after hearing rumors of the base's possible closure, that the name would endear the base among military leaders and be enough to incentivize its continued existence. Unfortunately, Eaker Air Force Base topped the Strategic Air Command's list of base closures in 1991 and with the Cold War coming to an end, the installation was officially chosen; in March 1992, the last aircraft left the base. Extensive efforts to offset the negative economic effects on the community of Blytheville were undertaken by local and federal officials, who cleaned up the site and then distributed the land to various organizations, including the Department of the Interior (DOI), the Fish and Wildlife Service (FWS), and the Department of Veterans Affairs (VA). Some of the land has since been declared a National Historic Landmark.

The base closure cost the community over 700 civilian jobs, but half of these were recovered through the adaptive reuse of the former base, such as United States Post Office's utilization of the base in the late 1990s as an airport hub during the holidays, some of the base housing being converted by Westminster Village of the Mid-South for a retirement community, the construction of a $2.5 million sports complex by the local community, and the private investment of some $3 million for the creation of the Thunder Bayou Golf Course.

Historic district

The Blytheville Air Force Base Strategic Air Command (SAC) Alert and Weapons Storage Areas Historic District was listed on the National Register of Historic Places in 2018.

It is a  historic district which included 23 contributing buildings, 33 contributing structures, two contributing sites, a contributing object, as well as two non-contributing buildings.

Major commands to which assigned

 Army Air Force Flying Training Command, 10 June 1942 – 16 June 1945
 Continental Air Forces, 16 June 1945 – 21 March 1946
 Redesignated Strategic Air Command, 21 March 1946 – 1 April 1946
 Tactical Air Command, 1 April 1946 – 15 August 1946, 10 June 1953 – 1 October 1953
 Air Materiel Command, 1 October 1953 – 1 July 1954
 Tactical Air Command, 1 July 1954 – 1 April 1958
 Strategic Air Command, 1 April 1958 – 1 June 1992
 Air Combat Command, 1 June 1992 – 15 December 1992 (not operational)

Major units assigned
 25th Twin Engine Flying Training Group, 25 July 1942 – 29 February 1944
 Army Air Force Pilot School, 3 May 1942 – 31 May 1945
 211th Army Air Force Base Unit, 1 May 1944 – 15 June 1945
 809th Army Air Force Base Unit, 16 June 1945 – 31 March 1946
 334th Army Air Force Base Unit, 1 April 1946 – 25 November 1946
 461st Bombardment Wing, 8 April 1956 – 1 April 1958
 4329th Air Base Squadron, 1 April 1958 – 1 July 1959
 97th Bombardment Wing, 1 July 1959 – 1 September 1991
 Redesignated: 97th Wing, 1 September 1991 – 1 April 1992

Major aircraft assigned
 North American AT-6, 1942–1944
 Curtiss AT-9, 1942–1944
 Beech AT-10, 1942–1944
 Republic AT-12, 1942–1944
 North American TB-25, 1944
 Curtiss C-46, 1945
 Douglas C-47, 1945
 Martin B-57 Canberra, 1956–1958
 Boeing B-52G Stratofortress, 1960–1992
 Boeing KC-135A Stratotanker, 1961–1992

See also

 Arkansas World War II Army Airfields
 30th Flying Training Wing (World War II)
 Eaker site, a major archaeological site within the base's grounds

References

Bibliography

External links

 Arkansas Aeroplex
 Abandoned & Little Known Airfields
 Biography of Ira C. Eaker
 Arkansas Northeastern College (formerly Mississippi County CC)
 Video of Eaker AFB former alert pad

Installations of the United States Air Force in Arkansas
Airports in Arkansas
Installations of Strategic Air Command
Military installations closed in 1988
Transportation in Mississippi County, Arkansas
1988 disestablishments in Arkansas
Blytheville, Arkansas
National Register of Historic Places in Mississippi County, Arkansas